Waldemar Gerhardt (born 6 January 1939) is a retired German footballer, who played as a forward. He scored 32 goals in 82 matches in the Bundesliga.

References

External links 

1939 births
Living people
German footballers
Association football forwards
Bundesliga players
FC Schalke 04 players
Fortuna Düsseldorf players
Sportspeople from Gelsenkirchen
Footballers from North Rhine-Westphalia